Tyler Johnston (born June 14, 1987) is a Canadian actor. He is best known for his role as Stewart on the comedy series Letterkenny and Danny Lubbe in Less Than Kind.

Career 
Johnston's credits include appearances in the television series The Killing, Grand Star, Supernatural, Motive, Saving Hope, and Godiva's, and the films The Odds, The Phantoms, and Decoys 2: Alien Seduction.

Johnston was a nominated in the Best Supporting Actor in a Comedy Series category for Less Than Kind at both the 1st Canadian Screen Awards and the 2nd Canadian Screen Awards. In 2014, he was also nominated in the Best Lead Actor in a Television Film or Miniseries category for The Phantoms. In 2016, he was nominated by the Montreal International Wreath Film Festival Awards in the Best Actor category for his role as Edward K. Wehling, Jr. in the short film 2BR02B: To Be or Naught to Be, based on the story of the same name by Kurt Vonnegut.

Filmography

Film

Television

References

External links

Tyler Johnston at Instagram

1987 births
20th-century Canadian male actors
21st-century Canadian male actors
Canadian male television actors
Canadian male film actors
Male actors from British Columbia
Living people